Andrew Mowatt (born 24 May 1964) is a Canadian sprinter. He competed in the men's 4 × 100 metres relay at the 1988 Summer Olympics. Mowatt admitted to using performance-enhancing drugs at the Dubin Inquiry in 1989 and subsequently had his funding suspended.

References

1964 births
Living people
Canadian male sprinters
Canadian sportspeople in doping cases
Doping cases in athletics
Ben Johnson doping case
Athletes (track and field) at the 1988 Summer Olympics
Olympic track and field athletes of Canada
Place of birth missing (living people)